Ericeia goniosema is a moth in the family Erebidae. It is found in New Guinea and Australia, where it has been recorded from Queensland.

The wingspan is about 40 mm. This wings are variably patterned brown.

References

Moths described in 1922
Ericeia